Spulerina aphanosema is a moth of the family Gracillariidae. It is known from Zimbabwe.

References

Endemic fauna of Zimbabwe
Spulerina
Lepidoptera of Zimbabwe
Moths of Sub-Saharan Africa
Moths described in 1961